Entfernet euch, ihr heitern Sterne (Disperse yourselves, ye stars, serenely!),  1156 (formerly ), is a birthday cantata by Johann Sebastian Bach. He composed it in Leipzig to celebrate the 57th birthday of the Elector of Saxony, King Augustus II the Strong, and it was performed for him on his birthday, 12 May 1727, on the Marktplatz of Leipzig, by students of the University of Leipzig, with Bach directing.  The king was also presented with the work's libretto, written by Christian Friedrich Haupt.

The music to this secular birthday cantata by Bach is lost.  It has been speculated from the surviving libretto, however, that several movements from the Mass in B minor are derived from it.  A reconstruction has been created using the music of the Mass.

The cantata is counted among Bach's works for celebrations of the Leipzig University, Festmusiken zu Leipziger Universitätsfeiern.

Recordings 
The reconstruction by Dr. Klaus Höfner has been recorded.

References

External links 
  (libretto only)

1727 compositions
Secular cantatas by Johann Sebastian Bach
Lost musical works by Johann Sebastian Bach
Leipzig University